Let's Share Christmas is a 1996 Christmas album by jazz guitarist John Pizzarelli, accompanied by his ordinary trio of Martin Pizzarelli and Ray Kennedy. Also accompanying the trio on a number of tracks are various guest musicians and orchestras.

Track listing 
"Let It Snow! Let It Snow! Let It Snow!"
"Let's Share Christmas"
"White Christmas"
"Have Yourself a Merry Little Christmas"
"What Are You Doing New Year's Eve?"
"Sleigh Ride"
"Christmas Time Is Here"
"I'll Be Home for Christmas"
"Santa Claus Is Near"
"The Christmas Song"
"Snowfall"
"Silent Night"

Personnel
John Pizzarelliguitar
Martin Pizzarellidouble-bass
Ray Kennedypiano
Harry Allensaxophone
Jay Berlinerguitar
Jeff Claytonsaxophone
Andy Fuscosaxophone
Bill Watroustrombone
Michel Legrandconductor
The Vanguard Jazz Orchestra
Clayton/Hamilton Jazz Orchestra

References

1996 Christmas albums
Christmas albums by American artists
John Pizzarelli albums
Orchestral jazz albums
RCA Records Christmas albums
Jazz Christmas albums